Florian Becke (born 15 March 1983) is a German bobsledder who has competed since 2002. His best World Cup finish was first in the four-man event at Winterberg in January  2011.

He won gold at the 2011 FIBT World Championships in Königssee  in the mixed team event.

References

1983 births
Living people
German male bobsledders